Adrian Campbell (born 4 January 1969) is a former Australian rules footballer who played with Footscray and Melbourne in the Victorian Football League (VFL).

Campbell, who was recruited from Traralgon, spent much of his time at Melbourne in the reserves. He did however, from his 14 senior games in 1989, top Footscray's goal-kicking. His tally of 21 goals was the lowest total from their leading goal-kicker since 1963.

He is now an assistant football coach of Vermont Football Club in Victoria.

References

External links
 
 

1969 births
Australian rules footballers from Melbourne
Western Bulldogs players
Living people
Melbourne Football Club players
Traralgon Football Club players
People from Ringwood, Victoria